Rohitash Gour (born 24 March 1966) is an Indian actor best known for his leading character in the TV sitcoms Lapataganj and Bhabi Ji Ghar Par Hai!. He has also acted in films like Lage Raho Munna Bhai, Kya Kehna, Munna Bhai M.B.B.S and PK.

Early and personal life
Gour was born in Kalka and was a student of National School of Drama, New Delhi. He is married to Rekha Gour with whom he has two daughters.  Giti and Sanjiti.

Career
Rohitashv Gaur made his Bollywood debut in the 2001 biographical film Veer Savarkar. Although he has acted in 11 Bollywood films so far, most of them are very minor roles like police inspector role in college drama of Kya Kehna etc. He portrayed the role of Mukundilal Gupta, in the SAB TV sitcom Lapataganj – Sharad Joshi Ki Kahaniyon Ka Pata. He is currently working in &TVs comedy show Bhabi Ji Ghar Par Hai! as Manmohan Tiwari, an undergarments business man. He also acted in a 90's television serial named Ehsaas. His second film was 2002 Irrfan Khan starrer Pratha. He then acted in 2003 film Pinjar, where he played the role of protagonist's (Manoj Bajpai) brother. The same year, he acted in two more movies, Dhoop directed by the National Award winning director Ashwini Chaudhary and in Munna Bhai M.B.B.S. where he played the role of nariyal pani waala (coconut water vendor). After a one-year gap, he starred in 2005 film Matrubhoomi – A Nation Without Women. The same year, he starred in Sun Zarra, Lage Raho Munna Bhai, the sequel to the 2003 film Munna Bhai M.B.B.S., wherein he portrayed the role of Cuckoo, the antagonist Lucky Singh's (Boman Irani) secretary and in Dil Se Pooch? Kidhar Jaana Hai. Again after a gap of a year, in 2008, he was seen in the comedy film One Two Three (uncredited remake of Blame it on the Bellboy) and the much critically acclaimed A Wednesday!, where he portrayed the role of Ikhlaque Ahmed, a fictional terrorist.  In 2010 he acted in the film Atithi Tum Kab Jaoge?, where he portrayed the role of a bank manager. His latest release was PK in 2014 where he played as a police constable named Pandey Ji.

Filmography

Television

See also
 List of Indian television actors

References

External links
 
 

Living people
Indian male soap opera actors
Indian male film actors
1966 births
National School of Drama alumni